The following radio stations broadcast on FM frequency 91.1 MHz:

Argentina
 Aire de Santa Fe in Santa Fe de la Vera Cruz, Santa Fe
 Amadeus Cultura Musical in Buenos Aires
 Amistad in Río Gallegos, Santa Cruz
 Aries in Salta
 CN Radio in Rosario, Santa Fe
 de la Isla in Choele Choel, Rio Negro
 del Cerro in Villa Yacanto de Calamuchita, Córdoba
 del Sol in Río Cuarto, Córdoba
 Monseñor Jorge Gottau in Boquerón, Santiago del Estero
 LRH 721 del valle in Aristóbulo Del Valle, Misiones
 Infinito in Río Grande, Tierra del Fuego
 La Villa in Villa Gessell, Buenos Aires
 Lider in Jujuy
 Nexo Sport in Oberá, Misiones
 Nuestra FM in San Luis
 Nuevo Tiempo in Rosario, Santa Fe
 Radio Casilda Record in Casilda, Santa Fe
 Radio Con Vos Roca in General Roca, Río Negro
 Radio María in La Francia, Córdoba
 Radio María in Gobernador Virasoro, Corrientes
 Radio María in Yuto, Jujuy
 Radio María in El Bolsón, Río Negro
 Radio María in Calchaquí, Santa Fe
 Radio María in Carreras, Santa Fe 
 Radio María in Tupungato, Mendoza
 Ritmo in San Francisco, Córdoba
 SI in San Isidro, Buenos Aires
 Total in San Juan
 Universidad in Resistencia, Chaco
 Zero in Mendoza

Australia
 1CMS in Canberra, Australian Capital Territory
 3ABCRR in Bendigo, Victoria
 Hot 91 in Sunshine Coast, Queensland

Belize
KREM FM at Ladyville Village; Independence Village

Canada (Channel 216)
 CBAF-FM-22 in Saint-Quentin, New Brunswick
 CBFX-FM-6 in Mont-Laurier, Quebec
 CBN-FM-2 in Corner Brook, Newfoundland and Labrador
 CBNN-FM in Hopedale, Newfoundland and Labrador
 CBQA-FM in Churchill Falls, Newfoundland and Labrador
 CBSI-FM-2 in Schefferville, Quebec
 CFAD-FM in Salmo, British Columbia
 CFUT-FM in Shawinigan, Quebec
 CINN-FM in Hearst, Ontario
 CJRT-FM in Toronto, Ontario
 CJWH-FM in Whale Cove, Nunavut
 CKNN-FM in Bella Coola, British Columbia
 CKOJ-FM in Ouje-Bougoumou, Quebec
 CKOS-FM in Fort McMurray, Alberta
 CKQK-FM-2 in St. Edward, Prince Edward Island
 CKSX-FM in Sioux Narrows, Ontario
 CKXL-FM in St. Boniface, Manitoba
 VF2122 in Valemount, British Columbia
 VF2344 in Logan Lake, British Columbia
 VF2419 in Charlottetown, Newfoundland and Labrador
 VF2468 in Caribou, Nova Scotia
 VF2469 in Wood Island, Nova Scotia

China 

 TJTRS Tianjin Life Radio

Honduras 

 HRAX - Musiquera, La Esperanza, Intibucá
 HRAX - Musiquera, Siguatepeque, Comayagua
 HRAX - Musiquera, Comayagua, Comayagua
 HRVV - Radioactiva, La Ceiba, Atlántida

India
 Radio City (Indian radio station) in 20 cities (headquartered at Bangalore)

Malaysia
 Asyik FM in Kuala Lumpur
 Radio Klasik in Sandakan, Sabah

Mexico
XETRA-FM in Tijuana, Baja California
XHAN-FM in Ocotlán, Jalisco
XHAWL-FM in Jacala, Hidalgo
XHCCCW-FM in Valladolid, Yucatán
XHECM-FM in Ciudad Mante, Tamaulipas
XHFN-FM in Uruapan, Michoacán
XHFS-FM in Izúcar de Matamoros, Puebla
XHIO-FM in Tuxtla Gutiérrez, Chiapas
XHLTO-FM in León, Guanajuato
XHMZI-FM in Melchor Múzquiz, Coahuila
XHPECI-FM In Tulancingo, Hidalgo
XHPGUA-FM in Guachochi, Chihuahua
XHPLPZ-FM in La Paz, Baja California Sur
XHPTOJ-FM in Puerto Vallarta, Jalisco
XHTC-FM in Torreón, Coahuila

Nigeria
Classic FM in Port Harcourt

The Philippines (Channel 216) 
  in Tagbilaran, Bohol. Known as Bohol True Radio
DWDJ in Baguio City
DWNX-FM in Milaor, Naga City
DYYR in Boracay Island, Malay, Aklan
DYMC in Iloilo City
DWQL in Lucena City
DYTM in Tacloban City
DWPS in Gubat, Sorsogon
DWZB-FM in Puerto Princesa City
DXEP in General Santos City
DXNW in Digos City

United States (Channel 216)
 KANJ (FM) in Giddings, Texas
  in Sheridan, Arkansas
  in Garden City, Kansas
  in Vermillion, South Dakota
  in Clovis, New Mexico
  in Durant, Oklahoma
  in Park Hills, Missouri
  in Sun Valley, Idaho
 KBWC in Marshall, Texas
  in Moorhead, Minnesota
 KCFN in Wichita, Kansas
 KCIU-LP in Lawrence, Kansas
  in San Mateo, California
  in Thousand Oaks, California
  in Las Vegas, New Mexico
 KGPF in Sulphur Springs, Texas
 KGWB in Snyder, Texas
 KGWP in Pittsburg, Texas
 KHEC in Crescent City, California
  in Kerrville, Texas
 KHYG-FM in Hydaburg, Alaska
 KICW in Ottumwa, Iowa
  in Pocatello, Idaho
 KIVM in Fredericksburg, Texas
  in Lawton, Oklahoma
 KKLP in Perris, California
  in Enid, Oklahoma
 KLCF in Truth or Consequence, New Mexico
  in Morrison, Colorado
  in Lewistown, Montana
 KLPR in Kearney, Nebraska
 KLSU in Baton Rouge, Louisiana
  in Fairmead, California
 KLXG in Grants Pass, Oregon
 KMRA in Monahans, Texas
 KMTC in Russellville, Arkansas
  in Garberville, California
 KMWY in Jackson, Wyoming
  in Missoula, Montana
  in Lake Havasu City, Arizona
 KNLY in New Waverly, Texas
  in Nogales, Arizona
  in Minneapolis-Saint Paul, Minnesota
 KNSB in Bettendorf, Iowa
 KNSK in Fort Dodge, Iowa
 KODH-LP in Garryowen, Montana
 KOFG in Cody, Wyoming
 KOJO (FM) in Lake Charles, Louisiana
 KOLJ-FM in Wannaska, Minnesota
  in Spokane, Washington
 KQOA in Morton, Texas
  in Ardmore, Oklahoma
 KQXE in Eastland, Texas
 KRCG-FM in Santa Rosa, California
 KROH in Port Townsend, Washington
 KROV in Oroville, California
 KSGR in Portland, Texas
 KSJI in St. Joseph, Missouri
 KSKA in Anchorage, Alaska
  in Springfield, Missouri
 KSQI-LP in Salem, Oregon
 KSUU in Cedar City, Utah
  in Kingsville, Texas
  in Kelso, Washington
 KTMK in Tillamook, Oregon
 KTNE-FM in Alliance, Nebraska
  in Reliance, South Dakota
 KTWP in Twisp, Washington
 KUCV in Lincoln, Nebraska
 KVER (FM) in El Paso, Texas
 KVKL in Las Vegas, Nevada
 KVNG in Eloy, Arizona
 KVUJ in Lake Jackson, Texas
  in Eugene, Oregon
  in Gunnison, Colorado
 KWTS in Canyon, Texas
  in La Crescent, Minnesota
 KXRY in Portland, Oregon
  in Monroe, Louisiana
 KYAY in San Carlos, Arizona
  in Yakima, Washington
 KZNR in Red Dog Mine, Alaska
 KZTX in Encino, Texas
 WABR in Tifton, Georgia
 WAJH in Birmingham, Alabama
  in Selma, Alabama
  in Natchez, Mississippi
  in Troy, Alabama
 WAYU in Steele, Alabama
 WBEK in Kankakee, Illinois
 WBFK in Hiseville, Kentucky
  in Brunswick, Maine
  in Hagerstown, Indiana
 WCOX in Bedford, Pennsylvania
  in Lafayette Township, Indiana
  in Carbondale, Illinois
 WDDE in Dover, Delaware
 WEBK in Society Hill, South Carolina
 WEDM in Indianapolis, Indiana
 WEGL in Auburn, Alabama
 WFMU in East Orange, New Jersey
 WFPW in Battens Crossroads, Alabama
 WFUM in Flint, Michigan
  in Goshen, Indiana
  in Plainfield, Vermont
  in Houghton, Michigan
  in Kenosha, Wisconsin
 WGXM in Calypso, North Carolina
  in Highland Springs, Virginia
  in Bel Air, Maryland
 WHMF in Marianna, Florida
 WHMO (FM) in Madison, Indiana
 WHSK in Bloomsburg, Pennsylvania
  in Hudson, New York
  in Carlinville, Illinois
 WILV in Loves Park, Illinois
 WIRE (FM) in Lebanon, Indiana
 WJEP in Cusseta, Georgia
  in North Adams, Massachusetts
 WJNH in Conway, New Hampshire
 WKAO in Ashland, Kentucky
 WKCS in Knoxville, Tennessee
 WKER-FM in McCormick, South Carolina
  in Lakeland, Florida
  in Memphis, Tennessee
 WMHU in Cold Brook, New York
 WMPF-LP in Rumford, Maine
 WMSS in Middletown, Pennsylvania
  in Starkville, Mississippi
  in Amherst, Massachusetts
  in Nantucket, Massachusetts
  in Norco, Louisiana
 WNSB in Norfolk, Virginia
 WNXP in Nashville, Tennessee
  in Danville, Virginia
  in Cadillac, Michigan
 WOSB in Marion, Ohio
 WOSE in Coshocton, Ohio
 WOSX in Granville, Ohio
  in Appleton, Wisconsin
  in Pittsford, Michigan
  in Bluefield, West Virginia
  in Fort Walton Beach, Florida
 WQCP in Fort Pierce, Florida
 WQHD-LP in Aguada-Aguadilla, Puerto Rico
 WREK in Atlanta, Georgia
  in Middlebury, Vermont
  in Alliance, Ohio
 WRPV in Ridgway, Pennsylvania
  in Rockingham, North Carolina
  in Jackson Township, Pennsylvania
  in Cleveland, Ohio
 WRWX in Winchendon, Massachusetts
  in Grove City, Pennsylvania
  in Fairfield, Connecticut
  in Saratoga Springs, New York
  in Corning, New York
 WSVH in Savannah, Georgia
  in Charlottesville, Virginia
 WTKL in North Dartmouth, Massachusetts
 WTRM in Winchester, Virginia
  in Potsdam, New York
 WTSE in Benton, Tennessee
  in Saint Marks, Florida
 WUMM in Machias, Maine
 WUNW-FM in Welcome, North Carolina
  in Concord, New Hampshire
 WVNK in Manchester, Vermont
 WVRP in Roanoke Rapids, North Carolina
 WVUB in Vincennes, Indiana
  in Toms River Township, New Jersey
 WXEV in Bradford, Rhode Island
 WYBH in Fayetteville, North Carolina
  in Gaffney, South Carolina
  in Columbus, Indiana
  in Gettysburg, Pennsylvania
  in Aurora, North Carolina
 WZTH in Tusculum, Tennessee

References

Lists of radio stations by frequency